The general speed limits in Malta are as follows:

References

Malta
Roads in Malta